Secret World Live is a film of a Peter Gabriel concert in 1993, as part of his Secret World Tour to support his sixth solo album, Us. The show is performed across two stages: a square and a circular stage, bridged by a conveyor belt. It was released on VHS, LaserDisc and DVD. An album of the same title with a similar track listing was also released.

The film received the 1996 Grammy Award for Best Long Form Music Video.

The film has been remastered and became available on DVD and Blu-ray on 2 July 2012 in the UK and 24 July 2012 in North America. The new release also contains the song "Red Rain" that was not present on the original releases.

Track listing
"Come Talk to Me" 6:39
"Steam" 7:53
"Across the River" 5:57
"Slow Marimbas" 1:45
"Shaking the Tree" 7:12
"Blood of Eden" 7:02
"San Jacinto" 7:34
"Kiss That Frog" 6:21
"Washing of the Water" 3:55
"Solsbury Hill" 4:27
"Digging in the Dirt" 6:55
"Sledgehammer"    6:05
"Secret World" 10:16
"Don't Give Up" 7:34
"In Your Eyes" 12:48

Bonus tracks
"Red Rain"
"Steam" (remixed "quiet" version)
"The Rhythm of the Heat"

Personnel
Peter Gabriel — lead vocals, keyboards, harmonica ("Kiss That Frog"), rainstick ("Slow Marimbas")
Tony Levin – bass, Chapman stick, synthesizer, backing vocals
David Rhodes – guitar, backing vocals
Manu Katche – drums, backing vocals
Jean-Claude Naimro – keyboards, backing vocals
Shankar – violin, backing vocals
Levon Minassian – doudouk ("Blood of Eden")
Paula Cole – backing vocals, co-lead vocals ("Shaking the Tree", "In Your Eyes" and "Don't Give Up")
Ayub Ogada – backing vocals
Papa Wemba – guest vocals ("In Your Eyes")
Reddy Amissi – backing vocals
Stino Mubi – backing vocals

Charts

Weekly charts

Certifications

References

Peter Gabriel video albums
1994 video albums
Geffen Records video albums
Virgin Records video albums